Hong Qi (born November 4, 1963) is an American politician who represents the 15th legislative district in the Maryland House of Delegates. Qi previously worked as a chief administrator for economic development under Isiah Leggett.

Early life and career
Qi was born in Shanghai, China on November 4, 1963. She grew up during the height of the Cultural Revolution, during which her family was persecuted. She migrated to Indiana on February 22, 1989, where she attended Manchester University on a sponsorship from Manchester professor Al Deeter, for who she worked as a translator when he visited Shanghai. While at Manchester, she met her future husband, Yu "Phil" Peng. She graduated from Manchester University in 1991, earning a M.A. degree in communication studies. Afterwards, the couple worked at universities in Athens, Ohio, and Morgantown, West Virginia. In 1997, the couple moved to Montgomery County, Maryland after Qi accepted a position working on multicultural affairs at American University. She became a citizen of the United States in 1999 and earned a M.B.A. degree in marketing and global information technology management in 2001 while working at American University. After graduating, Qi began working on economic development for a couple of nonprofit organizations.

Qi began her career in politics with under the administration of Montgomery County executive Ike Leggett, who asked her to serve as a liaison to the Asian American community after his election win in 2006. In April 2016, Leggett appointed Qi to serve as his Assistant Chief Administrative Officer on economic and workforce matters in Montgomery County, becoming the first Asian American to serve the position. Following Hillary Clinton's loss in the 2016 United States presidential election, Qi applied to a training course hosted by Emerge Maryland, an organization created to prepare potential female Democratic candidates for public office, to learn about the process of running for public office. Utilizing her experience at Emerge Maryland, she announced her candidacy for the Maryland House of Delegates in November 2017, seeking to succeed Delegate Aruna Miller. During the Democratic primary, she was endorsed by Leggett and the Maryland Sierra Club. Her 2018 campaign and election were noted for mobilizing the local Chinese-American community through WeChat. She won the general election with 23.6 percent of the vote, becoming the first Chinese-born state legislator in Maryland.

In the legislature
Qi was sworn into the Maryland House of Delegates on January 9, 2019.

Committee assignments
 Deputy Majority Whip, 2022–present
 Member, Economic Matters Committee, 2019–present (workers' compensation subcommittee, 2019–present; vice-chair, business regulation subcommittee, 2022–present, member, 2019–present)
 Study Group on Economic Stability, 2020–present
 Joint Committee on Federal Relations, 2021–present

Other memberships
 Member, Maryland Legislative Asian-American and Pacific-Islander Caucus, 2019–present
 Member, Maryland Legislative Latino Caucus, 2019–present
 Member, Maryland Legislative Transit Caucus, 2019–present
 Member, Women Legislators of Maryland, 2019–present

Political positions

Alcohol
Qi introduced legislation in 2021 legislative session that would allow for the sale of beer and wine in grocery stores. She introduced legislation in the 2022 legislative session that would create a ballot referendum on allowing grocery stores to sell wine and beer, but it failed to move out of committee.

COVID-19 pandemic
In June 2020, Qi coordinated the donation of 20,000 masks from Xi'an, a sister city of Montgomery County, Maryland, in response to the COVID-19 pandemic.

In August 2020, Qi joined a half dozen Maryland legislators in sending a letter to Governor Larry Hogan to push for widespread antibody testing and public disclosure of the results.

Education
During her 2018 campaign, Qi said that she supports expanding magnet programs in Montgomery County and making universal pre-K a statewide priority.

Housing
In January 2021, Qi voted against legislation that would require Montgomery County landlords to provide just cause for evicting a tenant from a residential property, saying that there could be a better solution, such as a third-party "referee" and that some landlords might rely on one or two properties as a main income stream.

Qi introduced legislation in the 2021 legislative session that would create a pilot program to provide homeless people with a mobile laundry service. The bill passed and was signed into law by Governor Larry Hogan on May 18, 2021.

Immigration
Qi says that she "does not believe Maryland needs sanctuary community designation", conveying that Maryland already has safe and welcoming communities. She opposes the use of local resources to enforce federal law when it comes to sanctuary policies.

Minimum wage
Qi supports a $15 minimum wage. She voted in favor of Senate Bill 280, which would gradually raise the state's minimum wage to $15 an hour by 2025.

National politics
In April 2016, Qi endorsed Hillary Clinton in the 2016 Democratic Party presidential primaries and Chris Van Hollen in the 2016 United States Senate election in Maryland. She also moderated a non-partisan debate between candidates for Maryland's 8th congressional district in 2016.

In January 2020, Qi filed to run as a convention delegate for Pete Buttigieg at the 2020 Democratic National Convention.

Social issues
Qi supported Question 6, saying that a vote in favor of same-sex marriage would improve the climate for entrepreneurs in Maryland.

In March 2018, Qi testified in support of naming an elementary school in Montgomery County after Bayard Rustin, noting that her son came out as gay the summer before he began college.

Electoral history

References

External links 
 

1963 births
21st-century American women politicians
21st-century American politicians
American politicians of Chinese descent
Asian-American people in Maryland politics
Living people
Democratic Party members of the Maryland House of Delegates
Women state legislators in Maryland
Politicians from Shanghai
Chinese emigrants to the United States
Manchester University (Indiana) alumni
Kogod School of Business alumni